Heather Marie Boushey (born 1970) is an American economist. Boushey currently serves as a member of President Joe Biden's Council of Economic Advisers. She previously was the president and CEO of the Washington Center for Equitable Growth. She has also worked as an economist at the Center for American Progress and the United States Congress Joint Economic Committee.

Early life and education

Boushey was born in Seattle and grew up in Mukilteo, Washington. She earned her bachelor's degree from Hampshire College and her Ph.D. in economics from The New School for Social Research.

Career
Boushey's work focuses on the relation between inequality and economic growth. She previously served as an economist for the Center for American Progress, the United States Congress Joint Economic Committee, the Center for Economic and Policy Research, and the Economic Policy Institute.

She currently sits on the board of the Opportunity Institute and is an associate editor of Feminist Economics and a senior fellow at the Schwartz Center for Economic and Policy Analysis at the New School for Social Research. Boushey was previously a Research Affiliate with the National Poverty Center at the Gerald R. Ford School of Public Policy and was on the editorial review board of WorkingUSA and the Journal of Poverty.

She has testified before the U.S. Congress and authored numerous reports and commentaries on issues affecting working families, including the implications of the 1996 welfare reform. She is a co-author of The State of Working America 2002–3 and Hardships in America: The Real Story of Working Families.

Boushey was announced as chief economist on the Clinton-Kaine transition following the Democratic National Convention in July 2016.

In 2019, she published Unbound: How Economic Inequality Constricts Our Economy and What We Can Do About It, which was called "outstanding" and "piercing" by reviewers and named one of the best economics books of 2019 by Martin Wolf of the Financial Times and MIT Technology Review. She is also the author of Finding Time: The Economics of Work-Life Conflict and a co-editor of After Piketty: The Agenda for Economics and Inequality, a volume of 22 essays about how to integrate inequality into economic thinking.

In August 2020, Boushey was featured in a New York Times article focusing on her role in the Biden presidential campaign and the work that she and Equitable Growth have been doing in the wake of COVID-19. Shortly after Biden's victory in November 2020, it was announced that Boushey would serve as a member of Biden's Council of Economic Advisers.

Analysis of women's participation in the labor force 
In response to a series of articles in the New York Times that claimed that highly educated women were dropping out of the labor force because of "the motherhood movement", Boushey published results of econometric analysis that showed that the opposite was true and that these women, along with women and workers in the economy as a whole, were merely suffering the effects of the U.S. recession and jobless recovery. Bureau of Labor Statistics economists Emy Sok and Sharon Cohany found that, in 2005, the participation rate of married mothers with preschoolers was 60%, about 4 percentage points lower than its peak in 1997 and 1998. Economist Saul Hoffman found that, between 1984 and 2004, the presence of children has had a smaller negative impact on the labor force participation of all women aged 25–44 years. This finding confirms Boushey's report of a declining child penalty. However, this effect varies greatly by marital status: The labor force participation rate of single mothers aged 25–44 years increased 9 percentage points between 1993 and 2000, while the rate for single women aged 25–44 years with children aged 5 years or younger jumped a full 14 percentage points over the same period. In contrast, the labor force participation rate for married mothers increased 1 percentage point, and the rate for married women with children aged 5 years or younger was flat.

Criticism from staff 
After Boushey's role in the Biden administration was announced, Claudia Sahm, a former employee at Equitable Growth, accused her of mismanagement. Sahm claimed that she had been pushed out of her job after publishing a blog post regarding racism, sexism, and elitism in economics that Boushey took issue with. Equitable Growth denied Sahm's account. Documents released by Wikileaks mention that five former staff members cited Boushey's management as a factor in their resignations. One colleague described Boushey as "phenomenally incompetent as a manager" and others have alleged she was prone to verbal outbursts.

Personal life 

On March 31, 2007, Boushey married Todd Tucker, formerly research director of the Global Trade Watch division of Public Citizen, who specializes in the legal, economic, and political consequences of trade agreements, including the North American Free Trade Agreement (NAFTA).

Selected publications

References

External links
 
 
 

1970 births
21st-century American economists
American women economists
Center for American Progress people
Economists from New York (state)
Economists from Washington (state)
Hampshire College alumni
Living people
People from Mukilteo, Washington
Scientists from Seattle
The New School alumni
United States Council of Economic Advisers
21st-century American women